Bosco–Caesar is an Indian choreographer duo who work in Indian films. They are Bosco Martis and Caesar Gonsalves, who have together worked on 200 songs and about 75 films. They run the Bosco Caesar Dance Company in Brampton, Scarborough, Mumbai, Phoolbagan, and Salt Lake in Kolkata.

They won the 2011  National Film Award for Best Choreography for the "Senorita" in Zindagi Na Milegi Dobara, for which they also won the Filmfare Award for Best Choreography.

Early life and education
Bosco Martis (born 27 November 1974) and Caesar Gonsalves (born 23 February 1973) grew up in Mumbai where they both went to St. Joseph's School in Juhu and played football together. Bosco was inspired by Caesar's dancing performances and practiced on his own to catch up with his future partner's abilities. The two attended Mithibai College and graduated in 1990.

Career
Bosco–Caesar started as backup dancer for choreographers LOLLYPOP and Farah Khan. Thereafter, they started their independent career as choreographers in 1994, when they choreographed a stage show for singers duo Shaan and Sagarika for an awards function. Next they choreographed a music video for singer Raageshwari's number "Oye Shava". During the filming of the video, ad film director Prahlad Kakkar happened to walk in and, in turn, asked them to choreograph a few TV commercials he was shooting with cricketer Sachin Tendulkar. Eventually this led to their feature film debut with Vidhu Vinod Chopra's Mission Kashmir in 2000.

Bosco–Caesar announced that they would be officially parting ways while keeping the brand intact in 2016, with Bosco making his directorial debut and Caesar organizing dance workshops. The duo reunited in 2019 to choreograph a song for Sajid Nadiadwala's Chhichhore.

Television 
They appeared as mentors in TV reality series, Fame Gurukul (2005) and Chak Dhoom Dhoom (2010) & Bosco appeared as a judge So You Think You Can Dance India (2017) and Dance India Dance Season 7 (2019).

Filmography
 Mission Kashmir (2000)
 Sur: The Melody of Life (2002)
 Kuch Naa Kaho (2003)
 Munnabhai M.B.B.S. (2003)
 Lakshya (2004)
 Swades (2004, Yeh Tar Woh Tara)
 Bunty Aur Babli (2005)
 Bluffmaster! (2005)
 Fight Club – Members Only (2006)
 Taxi No. 9 2 11: Nau Do Gyarah (2006)
 Jab We Met (2007)
 Salaam-E-Ishq (2007)
 Partner (2007)
 Viyyalavari Kayyalu (2007, Telugu)
 Love Aaj Kal (2009)
 3 Idiots (2009)
 Theeradha Vilaiyattu Pillai (2010, Tamil)
 Orange (2010, Telugu)
 We are Family (2010)
 Dum Maaro Dum (2011)
 Lafangey Parindey (2010)
 Force (2011)
 Zindagi Na Milegi Dobara (2011)
 Mere Brother Ki Dulhan (2011)
 Always Kabhi Kabhi (2011)
 Rockstar (2011)
 Desi Boyz (2011)
 Khokababu (2012, Bengali) 
 Players  (2012)
 Ek Main Aur Ekk Tu (2012)
 Student of the Year (2012)
 Agent Vinod (2012)
 Matru Ki Bijlee Ka Mandola (2013)
 Raanjhanaa (2013)
 Phata Poster Nikhla Hero (2013)
 Besharam (2013)
 R... Rajkumar (2013)
 Jackpot (2013)
 Hasee Toh Phasee (2014)
 Gunday (2014)
 Main Tera Hero (2014)
 Queen (2014)
 Bhoothnath Returns (2014)
 Holiday: A Soldier is Never Off Duty (2014)
 Daawat-e-Ishq (2014)
 Bang Bang! (2014)
 Ungli (2014)
 PK (2014)
 Shamitabh (2015)
 Shaandaar (2015)
 Dil Dhadakne Do (2015)
 Pyaar Ka Punchnama 2 (2015)
 Royal (2015, Bengali)
 Tamasha (2015)
 Srimanthudu (2015, Telugu)
 Loveshhuda (2016)
 Fitoor (2016)
 Ki & Ka (2016)
 Baaghi (2016)
 Udta Punjab (2016)
  DIshoom (2016)
 Happy Bhaag Jayegi (2016)
 A Flying Jatt (2016)
 Baar Baar Dekho (2016)
 Tutak  Tutak Tutiya (2016)
 Rock On 2 (2016)
 Dangal (2016)
 Dhruva (2016, Telugu)
 Raees (2017)
 Jolly LLB 2 (2017)
 Machine (2017)
 Badrinath Ki Dulhania (2017)
 A Gentleman (2017)
 Bareilly Ki Barfi (2017)
 Jab Harry Met Sejal (2017)
 Lucknow Central (2017)
 Judwaa 2 (2017)
 Love Per  Square Foot (2018)
 Sonu Ke Titu Ki Sweety (2018)
 Veerey Ki Wedding (2018)
 Gold (2018)
 2.0 (2018, Tamil)
 Rajaratha (2018, Kannada)
 Zero (2018)
 Indian 2 (2019, Tamil)
 De De Pyaar De (2019)
 Chhichhore (2019)
 War (2019)
 Tanhaji : The Unsung Warrior (2020)
 Chhalaang (2020)
 Koi Jaane Na (2021)
 Butterfly (2020, Kannada)
 Jersey (2022)
 Bhool Bhulaiyaa 2 (2022)
 Jugjugg Jeeyo (2022)
 Doctor G (2022)
 An Action Hero (2022)
 Pathaan (2023)
 Shehzada (2023)
 Tu Jhoothi Main Makkaar (2023)

Independent songs 
 Baha Kiliki (Smita, 2016)
 I am a Disco Dancer 2.0 (Tiger Shroff, 2020)
 Nach Meri Rani (Guru Randhawa, 2020)
 Dance Meri Rani (Guru Randhawa, 2021)

Director 
 Rocket Gang (2022) (Directed by Bosco)

Awards

See also 

 Wahab Shah

References

External links
 
 

Living people
Duos
Artists from Mumbai
Indian film choreographers
Dancers from Maharashtra
Filmfare Awards winners
Indian male dancers
21st-century Indian dancers
Best Choreography National Film Award winners
Year of birth missing (living people)